Garça is a town located in the west-central part of the state of São Paulo, Brazil. The population is 44,409 (2020 est.) in an area of 556 km2.

Established on October 4, 1924, it was one of the cities that had been part of the coffee circle, in the beginning of the 20th century. Garça is known for its coffee plantations, the iron line city and by the Cerejeiras Festival ("cherry tree festival") that takes place every year.

Geography

Climate
The climate is subtropical with temperatures ranging from 17.8 °C to 28.5 °C.  The precipitation is 1.274,4 mm/a. The rainy season occurs in the summer (December until March), with the temperature hovering between 25 and 30 °C.  Low temperatures occur in the months of April and July.

Topography
Garça is situated in a landscape of rolling hills, where many small streams are formed, converging all to the formation of the rivers Rio do Peixe, Tibiriça and Feio.

Soil types
Podzol, Marília Variation

Vegetation
The region is characterized by lush vegetation, predominantly grassy, while the native vegetation was primarily tropical forest.

Famous Garcenses
 Roberto Carlos, football player.
 Valdir Peres, football player.

References

 
Populated places established in 1924